Hugh Franklin Waters (July 20, 1932 – April 16, 2002) was a United States district judge of the United States District Court for the Western District of Arkansas.

Education and career

Born in Hackett, Arkansas, Waters received a Bachelor of Science in agricultural engineering from the University of Arkansas in 1955. He was in the United States Navy as a Lieutenant (JG) from 1955 to 1958. He was an agricultural engineer at the Ralston Purina Company in St. Louis, Missouri from 1958 to 1964. He received a Bachelor of Laws from Saint Louis University School of Law in 1964. He was the company attorney at Ralston Purina from 1964 to 1966. He was in private practice of law in Springdale, Arkansas from 1967 to 1981. He was a part-time instructor at the University of Arkansas Law School in 1968.

Federal judicial service

Waters was nominated by President Ronald Reagan on August 28, 1981, to a seat on the United States District Court for the Western District of Arkansas vacated by Judge Paul X. Williams. He was confirmed by the United States Senate on October 21, 1981, and received his commission on October 26, 1981. He served as Chief Judge from 1981 to 1997. He assumed senior status on August 1, 1997. His service was terminated on April 16, 2002, due to his death in Fayetteville, Arkansas.

References

Sources
 

Judges of the United States District Court for the Western District of Arkansas
Agricultural engineers
1932 births
2002 deaths
Saint Louis University School of Law alumni
University of Arkansas alumni
Ralston Purina
United States Navy officers
People from Springdale, Arkansas
United States district court judges appointed by Ronald Reagan
20th-century American judges